Paul Felinger (20 June 1913 – June 1992) was an Austrian sprint canoer who competed in the late 1940s and early 1950s. He won two medals in the K-4 1000 m event at the ICF Canoe Sprint World Championships with a silver in 1948 and a bronze in 1950.

References

Paul Felinger's profile at Sports Reference.com

1913 births
1992 deaths
Austrian male canoeists
ICF Canoe Sprint World Championships medalists in kayak
Canoeists at the 1948 Summer Olympics
Olympic canoeists of Austria